The 1066 Granada massacre took place on 30 December 1066 (9 Tevet 4827; 10 Safar 459 AH) when a Muslim mob stormed the royal palace in Granada, in the Taifa of Granada, killed and crucified the Jewish vizier Joseph ibn Naghrela, and massacred much of the Jewish population of the city.

Joseph ibn Naghrela
Joseph ibn Naghrela, or Joseph ha-Nagid ( Ribbi Yehosef ben Shemu'el ha-Lewi ha-Nagid;  Abu Hussein bin Naghrela) (15 September 1035 – 30 December 1066), was a vizier to the Berber monarch Badis ibn Habus, king of the Taifa of Granada, during the Moorish rule of al-Andalus, and the nagid or leader of the Iberian Jews.

Life and career
Joseph was born in Granada, the eldest son of Rabbi and famous poet and warrior Samuel ibn Naghrillah.

Some information about his childhood and upbringing is preserved in the collection of his father's Hebrew poetry in which Joseph writes that he began copying at the age of eight and a half. For example, he tells how once (at nine and a half, in the spring of 1045) he accompanied his father to the battlefield, only to suffer from severe homesickness, about which he wrote a short poem.

His primary school teacher was his father. On the basis of a letter to Nissim ben Jacob attributed to him, in which Joseph refers to himself as Nissim's disciple, it is possible to infer that he also studied under Nissim at Kairouan. In 1049, Joseph married Nissim's daughter.

After the death of his father in 1056, Joseph succeeded him as vizier and rabbi, directing at the same time an important yeshiva. Among his students were Isaac Albalia and Isaac ibn Ghiyyat.

When Badis and his heir Buluggin were poisoned and died in 1073, it was loudly rumored that Joseph had done it himself. Things only worsened for him from there. He launched into a series of backfired intrigues, mishandled and misjudged situations, resulting in the kingdom sliding into crisis.

Character
Abraham ibn Daud describes Joseph in highly laudatory terms, saying that he lacked none of his father's good qualities, except that he was not quite as humble, having been brought up in luxury.

The 1906 edition of the Jewish Encyclopedia states, "Arabic chroniclers relate that he believed neither in the faith of his fathers nor in any other faith. It may also be doubted that he openly declared the principles of Islam to be absurd." Arabic poets also praised his liberality.

The Jewish Encyclopedia also reported that Joseph "completely ruled King Badis, who was nearly always drunk, and surrounded him with spies".

Muslim leaders accused him of several acts of violence, which drew upon him the hatred of the Berbers, the ruling majority at Granada. The most bitter among his many enemies was Abu Ishak of Elvira, who hoped to obtain an office at court and wrote a malicious poem against Joseph and his fellow Jews. The poem made little impression upon the king, who trusted Joseph implicitly, but it created a great sensation among the Berbers.

Massacre
In hopes of attaining his father's dream, Joseph sent messengers to Al-Mutasim ibn Sumadih the ruler of the neighboring Taifa of Almería, a traditional enemy of Granada. He promised to open the gates of the city to Al-Mutasim's army if he promised to install Joseph as king in exchange for his submission and allegiance. At the last moment, Al-Mutasim pulled out, and on the eve of the supposed invasion, word of the plot got out. When word reached the populace, Berbers claimed that Joseph intended to kill Badis and was about to betray the kingdom.

On 30 December 1066 (9 Tevet 4827), Muslim mobs stormed the royal palace where Joseph had sought refuge. The Jewish Encyclopaedia (1906) states Joseph was "hiding in a coal-pit, and having blackened his face so as to make himself unrecognizable. He was, however, discovered and killed, and his body was hanged on a cross." In the ensuing massacre of the Jewish population, many Jews of Granada were murdered. The 1906 Jewish Encyclopedia claims that "More than 1,500 Jewish families, numbering 4,000 persons, fell in one day." However the 1971 edition does not give precise casualty figures. That was possibly because the accounts of the massacre could not be verified, and as over 900 years had passed, it was subject to hyperbole. The Encyclopaedia Judaica also confirms the figures : "According to a later testimony, "more than 1,500 householders" were killed".

Joseph's wife fled to Lucena, Córdoba, with her son Azariah, where she was supported by the community. Azariah, however, died in early youth.

According to the historian Bernard Lewis, the massacre is "usually ascribed to a reaction among the Muslim population against a powerful and ostentatious Jewish vizier".

Lewis writes:

Particularly instructive in this respect is an ancient anti-Jewish poem of Abu Ishaq, written in Granada in 1066. This poem, which is said to be instrumental in provoking the anti-Jewish outbreak of that year, contains these specific lines:
Do not consider it a breach of faith to kill them, the breach of faith would be to let them carry on.
They have violated our covenant with them, so how can you be held guilty against the violators?
How can they have any pact when we are obscure and they are prominent?
Now we are humble, beside them, as if we were wrong and they were right!

Lewis continues: "Diatribes such as Abu Ishaq's and massacres such as that in Granada in 1066 are of rare occurrence in Islamic history".

The episode has been characterized as a pogrom. Walter Laqueur writes, "Jews could not as a rule attain public office (as usual there were exceptions), and there were occasional pogroms, such as in Granada in 1066".

See also
Timeline of Jewish history
Timeline of anti-Semitism
List of massacres in Spain

Sources 
 Constable, Olivia Remie, Medieval Iberia: Readings from Christian, Muslim, and Jewish Sources. University of Pennsylvania Press, 2011.

References

Bibliography
 Munk, Notice sur Abou'l Walid, pp. 94 et seq.;
 Dozy, R. Geschichte der Mauren in Spanien, German ed., ii. 300 et seq.;
 Grätz, Geschichte vi. 55 et seq., 415 et seq.;
 Ersch & Gruber, Encyclopedia section ii., part 31, p. 86.;
 
 Medieval Sourcebook: Abraham Ibn Daud: On Samuel Ha-Nagid, Vizier of Granada, 11 Cent
 Nagdela (Nagrela), Abu Husain Joseph Ibn by Richard Gottheil, Meyer Kayserling, Jewish Encyclopedia. 1906 ed.

11th century in Al-Andalus
11th-century massacres
Antisemitism in Spain
Anti-Jewish pogroms by Muslims
Conflicts in 1066
Lynching deaths
1066 in Europe
Massacres in Spain
Medieval anti-Jewish pogroms
Taifa of Granada